Balloon Man Running is a  tall sculpture by Sean O'Meallie, installed at Denver's Central Park station, in the U.S. state of Colorado.

References

Outdoor sculptures in Denver